Md. Ayeen Uddin is a Bangladesh Awami League politician and the incumbent Member of Parliament from Rajshahi-3.

Early life
Uddin was born on 10 December 1976 in his ancestral home village Mahishkundi in Mohanpur upazila of Rajshahi district. He holds a master's degree in business administration. His father, Habir Mandal, was the 3rd member of The East Pakistan Peace Committee of Mahishkundi village in Ghasigram union of Mohanpur in Rajshahi district according to 'Ekattarer Mohanpur' written by Bablur Rahman.

Career
Uddin has been involved in active politics since his student life. He was the general secretary of Rajshahi University Chhatra League. He was elected Member of Parliament from Rajshahi-3 constituency as a candidate of Bangladesh Awami League in the 10th Parliamentary Election of 5 January 2014. On 5 January 2015, he was attacked with bombs by members of Jamaat-e-Islami Bangladesh at a Rally in Rajshahi.

Uddin was elected Member of Parliament from Rajshahi-3 constituency in the Eleventh Parliamentary Election of 2018.

Ekattar TV published a report titled "Communal insults for seeking UP election nomination", which went viral overnight. Asking for the nomination of Raighati union, he told Suranjit Sarkar, president of Mohanpur upazila of Hindu-Buddhist-Christian Unity Parishad, "You are Hindu Jat, you are shala criminal." Suranjit was also abused by the MP.

Uddin is also accused of abusing power and occupying hundreds of bighas of crop land by waving red flags at will.

References

Awami League politicians
Living people
1976 births
10th Jatiya Sangsad members
11th Jatiya Sangsad members
3rd Jatiya Sangsad members